Drew Central School District 5  is a public school district located in Drew County, Arkansas.

The majority of Monticello itself is not in Drew Central School District, but is within a district of its own, Monticello School District. The school administration and buildings of Drew Dentral Schools are in a section of the Monticello city limits that is within the Drew Central Schools boundaries, adjacent to the University of Arkansas at Monticello (UAM). Dependent minor residents of the UAM housing for married students and students with families, HHFA Apartments, are assigned to this district. Additionally Wilmar is in the Drew Central district, as is the unincorporated area of Selma. A portion of the Drew Central district extends into Desha County.

History
The Drew County School Board established the A and M Training School #5 as a laboratory school for the Arkansas Agricultural and Mechanical College (now the University of Arkansas at Monticello). In 1934 school district's name changed to Drew Central School District #5. Growth in both the school district and the college as well as a fire that had destroyed the school buildings contributed to a decision for the school district to become independent of the college. The college gave the school district a 99-year lease to a plot of land. In 1983 the district added  to the lease.

Multiple districts consolidated into Drew Central. In 1979 the Collins and Selma school districts dissolved, with portions of the students going to the Drew Central school district. On July 1, 1990, the Wilmar School District was consolidated into the Drew Central School District.  this was the latest such consolidation.

Schools 
 Drew Central Elementary School, serving prekindergarten through grade 4.
 Drew Central Middle School, serving grades 5 through 8.
 Drew Central High School, serving grades 9 through 12.

From 1990 until 1992, the district operated schools in Wilmar after the consolidation of the Wilmar district. In 1992 the remaining Wilmar school(s) was/were consolidated into the Drew Central schools.

References

Further reading
These include maps of predecessor districts:
 (Download)

External links

 

Education in Drew County, Arkansas
Education in Desha County, Arkansas
School districts established in 1927
1927 establishments in Arkansas
University of Arkansas at Monticello
Monticello, Arkansas